Taff may refer to:
 River Taff, a large river in Wales
 Taff (TV series), a German tabloid news programme
 Trans-Atlantic Fan Fund, an organisation for science fiction fandom

People 
 a demonym for anyone from south Wales
 Jerry Taff (born 1940), American television anchor
 John Taff (1890–1961), American professional baseball player
 Laurence G. Taff (born 1947), American astronomer
 Paul Taff (1920–2013), American television executive
 Jane Harvey (née Phyllis Taff; 1925–2013), American jazz singer
 Russ Taff (born 1953), American gospel singer

See also 
 Taff Vale (disambiguation)
 Taft (disambiguation)